Stanley Weiser is an American screenwriter. He was born in New York City and is a graduate of the NYU Film School. His screen credits include Wall Street and W., both directed by Oliver Stone. He also wrote the 20th Century Fox film, Project X. He is credited for creating characters in the sequel to Wall Street: Wall Street: Money Never Sleeps. In addition, he served as script consultant on Oliver Stone's Nixon and Any Given Sunday.

Weiser's other projects include two civil rights dramas, developed as feature films, but made for television. Murder in Mississippi, a chronicle of the 1964 Freedom Summer movement and the lives and deaths of Cheney, Schwerner, and Goodman, the three young civil rights workers who were killed by the Ku Klux Klan, which aired on NBC in 1990. It was nominated for four Emmys and won the Directors Guild of America Award for best TV movie.  Freedom Song, a semi-fictional account of the early SNCC movement in Mississippi, was co-written with Phil Alden Robinson, who also directed. They shared a Writers Guild of America Award and Humanitas nomination for the 2000 TNT film.

Weiser also adapted the novel, Fatherland, by Robert Harris, for HBO. It was nominated for three Golden Globe awards and Miranda Richardson won for best supporting actress in a TV or cable movie. He wrote the NBC four-hour mini-series Witness to the Mob in 1998, which was produced by Robert De Niro. He also wrote Rudy: The Rudy Giuliani Story, for which he received a Writers Guild of America nomination for best TV movie.

As of 2012, he wrote a biopic on the life of Rod Serling, the writer and The Twilight Zone creator.

Weiser began his career as a production assistant for Brian De Palma on Phantom of the Paradise, and as an assistant cameraman on the Martin Scorsese documentary, Street Scenes.

He is married and lives in Santa Monica, California. He is a founding member of the West Los Angeles Shambhala Buddhist Meditation Center.

Filmography
Coast to Coast (1980)
Project X (1987)
Wall Street (1987)
Murder in Mississippi (1990)
Fatherland (1994)
Witness to the Mob (1998)
Freedom Song (2000)
Rudy: The Rudy Giuliani Story (2003)
W. (2008)

References

External links

Interview on W.

American male screenwriters
Tisch School of the Arts alumni
Writers from New York City
Living people
Screenwriters from New York (state)
Year of birth missing (living people)